is a Japanese mixed martial artist who competes in the bantamweight division of the Legacy Fighting Alliance. A professional mixed martial artist since 2010, Tanaka has also competed in the Ultimate Fighting Championship.

Mixed martial arts career

Shooto
Tanaka started his professional career in 2010. Until the first half of 2012, he fought only for Shooto, where he won the 2011 rookie 132-pound tournament.

Pacific Xtreme Combat
Tanaka faced Crisanto Pitpitunge on May 18, 2013 at PXC 37 for the bantamweight title. He won the title via unanimous decision after five rounds.

Tanaka defended his title against Kyle Aguon on October 25, 2013 at PXC 40. He defeated Aguon via unanimous decision over five rounds.

Ultimate Fighting Championship
In February 2014, it was announced that Tanaka has signed a contract with the Ultimate Fighting Championship.

In his debut, Tanaka faced Roland Delorme on June 14, 2014 at UFC 174. He won the fight via unanimous decision.

Tanaka faced Kang Kyung-ho on September 20, 2014 at UFC Fight Night 52. He lost the fight via split decision.  Despite the loss on the scorecards, Tanaka was awarded his first Fight of the Night bonus award.  Subsequently, Tanaka had his bonus award rescinded and in turn, was suspended for nine months after testing positive for banned substances during his post fight drug screening.''

Tanaka was briefly linked to a bout with Russell Doane on January 2, 2016 at UFC 195. However, Doane was forced from the bout with injury and replaced by Joe Soto. He won the fight by split decision.

Tanaka next faced Rani Yahya on September 24, 2016 at UFC Fight Night 95. He lost the fight via unanimous decision.

Tanaka faced promotional newcomer Ricardo Ramos on February 4, 2017 at UFC Fight Night 104. He lost the fight by unanimous decision.

In May 2017, Tanaka was released from the company.

Post-UFC career
In January 2018, it was announced that Tanaka has signed a contract with the Absolute Championship Berkut.

After two winning bouts in his native Japan, Tanaka signed a multi-fight contract with Legacy Fighting Alliance in April 2020. Tanaka is expected to make his promotional debut by headlining LFA 117 against Ricardo Dias on November 5, 2021. He won the fight via unanimous decision.

Tanaka faced Ary Farias at LFA 138 on August 5, 2022. He lost the fight by split decision. Two judges scored the fight 29–28 for Farias, while the third judge awarded an identical scorecard to Tanaka.

Championships and accomplishments

Mixed martial arts
 Ultimate Fighting Championship
 Fight of the Night (One time) 
 Pacific Xtreme Combat
 PXC bantamweight title (one time; former)
 One successful title defense
 Shooto
 Shooto rookie 132 lb champion (2011)
 Shooto rookie MVP award (2011)

Mixed martial arts record

|-
|  Loss
|align=center | 14–4
|Ary Farias
|Decision (split)
|LFA 138
|
|align=center | 3
|align=center | 5:00
|Shawnee, Oklahoma, United States
|
|-
|  Win
| align=center | 14–3
| Ricardo Dias
| Decision (unanimous)
| LFA 117
| 
| align=center | 3
| align=center | 5:00
| Visalia, California, United States
|
|-
| Win
| align=center | 13–3
| Vladimir Leontyev
| Decision (unanimous)
| Pancrase 303
| 
| align=center | 3
| align=center | 5:00
| Tokyo, Japan
|
|-
| Win
| align=center | 12–3
| Rogério Bontorin
| Submission (rear-naked choke)
| Grandslam 6: Way of the Cage
| 
| align=center | 3
| align=center | 2:27
| Tokyo, Japan
|
|-
| Loss
| align=center | 11–3
| Ricardo Ramos
| Decision (unanimous)
| UFC Fight Night: Bermudez vs. The Korean Zombie
| 
| align=center | 3
| align=center | 5:00
| Houston, Texas, United States
|
|-
| Loss
| align=center | 11–2
| Rani Yahya
| Decision (unanimous)
| UFC Fight Night: Cyborg vs. Länsberg
| 
| align=center | 3
| align=center | 5:00
| Brasília, Brazil
|
|-
| Win
| align=center | 11–1
| Joe Soto
| Decision (split)
| UFC 195
| 
| align=center | 3
| align=center | 5:00
| Las Vegas, Nevada, United States
|
|-
| Loss
| align=center | 10–1
| Kang Kyung-ho
| Decision (split)
| UFC Fight Night: Hunt vs. Nelson
| 
| align=center | 3
| align=center | 5:00
| Saitama, Japan
| 
|-
| Win
| align=center | 10–0
| Roland Delorme
| Decision (unanimous)
| UFC 174
| 
| align=center | 3
| align=center | 5:00
| Vancouver, British Columbia, Canada
|
|-
| Win
| align=center | 9–0
| Kyle Aguon
| Decision (unanimous)
| Pacific Xtreme Combat 40
| 
| align=center | 5
| align=center | 5:00
| Mangilao, Guam
| 
|-
| Win
| align=center | 8–0
| Crisanto Pitpitunge
| Decision (unanimous)
| Pacific Xtreme Combat 37
| 
| align=center | 5
| align=center | 5:00
| Pasig, Philippines
| 
|-
| Win
| align=center | 7–0
| Caleb Vallotton
| Submission (triangle choke)
| Pacific Xtreme Combat 36
| 
| align=center | 2
| align=center | 2:39
| Mangilao, Guam
|
|-
| Win
| align=center | 6–0
| Russell Doane
| Submission (rear-naked choke)
| Pacific Xtreme Combat 34
| 
| align=center | 3
| align=center | 2:09
| Quezon City, Philippines
|
|-
| Win
| align=center | 5–0
| Jong Hoon Choi
| Submission (rear-naked choke)
| Shooto: 3rd Round
| 
| align=center | 1
| align=center | 3:29
| Tokyo, Japan
|
|-
| Win
| align=center | 4–0
| Teruto Ishihara
| Decision (unanimous)
| Shooto: The Rookie Tournament 2011 Final
| 
| align=center | 2
| align=center | 5:00
| Tokyo, Japan
| 
|-
| Win
| align=center | 3–0
| Takuya Ogura
| Submission (triangle choke)
| Shooto: Gig Tokyo 7
| 
| align=center | 1
| align=center | 3:09
| Tokyo, Japan
|
|-
| Win
| align=center | 2–0
| Hiroshi Roppongi
| Technical Submission (armbar)
| Shooto: Gig Saitama 3
| 
| align=center | 2
| align=center | 1:29
| Fujimi, Japan
|
|-
| Win
| align=center | 1–0
| Yasutaka Hamaji
| Decision (unanimous)
| Shooto: Shooting Disco 13: Can't Stop Myself!
| 
| align=center | 2
| align=center | 5:00
| Tokyo, Japan
|

See also
 List of current UFC fighters
 List of male mixed martial artists

References

External links
 
 

1990 births
Living people
Sportspeople from Yokohama
Japanese male judoka
Japanese male mixed martial artists
Bantamweight mixed martial artists
Mixed martial artists utilizing judo
Ultimate Fighting Championship male fighters